Jubarajnagar Legislative Assembly constituency is one of the 60 Legislative Assembly constituencies of Tripura state in India. It is part of North Tripura district.

Members of the Legislative Assembly 

^ by-poll

Election results

2022 by-election

2018

See also
 List of constituencies of the Tripura Legislative Assembly
 North Tripura district

References

North Tripura district
Assembly constituencies of Tripura